Jorge María Mejía (31 January 1923 – 9 December 2014) was an Argentine cardinal of the Catholic Church (Roman Rite).

Early life and ordination
Mejía was born in Buenos Aires, Argentina, and ordained to the priesthood for the Metropolitan See of Buenos Aires on 22 September 1945. He taught Sacred Scripture at several universities, participated at the Second Vatican Council as a peritus and was made a Chaplain of His Holiness on 20 September 1978. He held a doctorate in theology from the Pontifical University of St. Thomas Aquinas (Angelicum) and a license in biblical science from the Pontifical Biblical Institute.

Bishop
On 8 March 1986 Mejía was appointed as titular bishop of Apollonia and an official of the Curial Pontifical Council for Justice and Peace. His episcopal consecration took place on 12 April 1986 and was performed by Cardinal Roger Etchegaray with Archbishop Eduardo Martínez Somalo and Bishop Antonio María Javierre Ortas as co-consecrators. On 5 March 1994 Mejía was named Secretary of the Congregation for Bishops and raised to the rank of Archbishop. Five days later, on 10 March 1994, he was appointed Secretary of the College of Cardinals. On 7 March 1998 he became both the archivist and the librarian of the Vatican Secret Archives.

Cardinal
On 21 February 2001 Mejía was appointed as Cardinal-Deacon of San Girolamo della Carità by Pope John Paul II in the consistory. On 24 November 2003 he retired as archivist and librarian of the Vatican Secret Archives. On 21 February 2011 he opted for the order of Cardinal Priest with his former diaconal church elevated to the level of cardinalitial title.

Mejía was 82 at the time of the 2005 papal conclave that elected Pope Benedict XVI and thus was not eligible to vote. In January 2010 Mejía led the delegation from the Holy See's Pontifical Commission for Religious Relations with the Jews meeting for the Commission for Dialogue between Jews and Catholics, the ninth such meeting. From 2013 until his death the following year he sat on the Board of World Religious Leaders for the interfaith dialogue-based organization, the Elijah Interfaith Institute. On 13 March 2013 Mejía suffered a heart attack on the same day his fellow Argentine Cardinal Jorge Mario Bergoglio was elected as Pope Francis, the 266th pontiff of the Catholic Church. Mejía died in Rome on 9 December 2014 at the age of 91.

References

External links

Catholic Hierarchy
The Elijah Interfaith Institute - Christian Members of the Board of World Religious Leaders

1923 births
2014 deaths
Argentine cardinals
Roman Catholic titular archbishops
Clergy from Buenos Aires
Members of the Congregation for Bishops
Cardinals created by Pope John Paul II
Pontifical Biblical Institute alumni
Pontifical University of Saint Thomas Aquinas alumni
People associated with the Vatican Library
Argentine expatriates in Italy